Aras District is in Poldasht County, West Azerbaijan province, Iran. At the 2006 National Census, the region's population (as a part of the former Poldasht District of Maku County) was 12,716 in 2,843 households. The following census in 2011 counted 14,049 people in 3,604 households, by which time the district had been separated from the county, Poldasht County established, and divided into two districts: the Central and Aras Districts. At the latest census in 2016, there were 13,793 inhabitants in 3,796 households.

References 

Poldasht County

Districts of West Azerbaijan Province

Populated places in West Azerbaijan Province

Populated places in Poldasht County